(in English, the "Sounding Stone") or The Eagle Stone is a small Class I Pictish stone located on a hill on the northern outskirts of Strathpeffer in Easter Ross, Scotland.

Description
Carved on the southeast side are two images, a horse shoe-like arc symbol above an eagle.

History
The stone was originally located further down the hill, towards Dingwall, but was moved to its current site in 1411. One old tradition is that the stone marks the site of a Scottish clan battle that took place in 1411 between the Clan Munro and a branch of the Clan MacDonald, and that the stone commemorates a Munro victory as it is marked with their symbol, an eagle. According to Norman Macrae the stone was placed there by the Munros while marching against Donald of Islay, Lord of the Isles.

The stone is associated with the prophecies of the 16th century Brahan Seer. He predicted that if the stone fell three times, the surrounding valley would be flooded, and the stone used as an anchor.

It has since fallen twice, and is now set in concrete.

References

Pictish stones
Pictish stones in Highland (council area)
Scheduled monuments in Scotland